Lewis and Clark National Forest is located in west central Montana, United States. Spanning , the forest is managed as two separate zones. The eastern sections, under the Jefferson Division, is a mixture of grass and shrublands dotted with "island" pockets of forested areas. Here, cattle leases to local ranchers as well as timber harvesting are the norm. The western Rocky Mountain Division, which straddles the Continental divide, is managed chiefly for environmental preservation, as much of the land has been designated as wilderness. Forest headquarters are located in Great Falls, Montana. Local ranger district offices have been established in Choteau, Harlowton, Neihart, Stanford, and White Sulphur Springs.
 
The forest lands were defined and established by the federal government in 1897, following its Treaty of 1896 with the Blackfeet establishing their adjacent reservation. This forest is one of the oldest forest preserves in the U.S. The forest is named in honor of the members of the Lewis and Clark Expedition, which passed through the forest between 1804 and 1806 while exploring the Louisiana Purchase for President Thomas Jefferson.

Prior to that, the region was inhabited by various cultures of Native Americans for a period of at least 8,000-10,000 years.  When the Lewis & Clark expedition came to this area, different areas of the large forest territory were used by members of the Blackfeet, Sioux, Cheyenne, Flathead and Crow nations for hunting and as an area for their seasonal winter camps. The forests provided shelter from the winter.

Description

The forest is divided into seven separate sections and encompasses eight mountain ranges; the Judith, Big Snowy, Little Snowy, Crazy, Castle, Little Belt and  Highwood Mountains. The westernmost section includes portions of the Scapegoat and the Bob Marshall wildernesses, and borders Glacier National Park to the north.

The western Rocky Mountain Division, informally called the Rocky Mountain Front, consists of a dense coniferous forest and has numerous species of spruce, fir, and pine. The Jefferson Division is dominated by ponderosa and lodgepole pine which prefer a drier climate. The grizzly bear and timber wolf are found in the western sections of the forest, and are especially dense in the designated wilderness areas. In addition, the western section contains much of the wildlife present at the time of the Lewis and Clark Expedition through the region. Mountain goats, bighorn sheep, elk, cougars, Canadian lynxes, wolverines and black bears are most common nearest the Continental Divide. In other sections of the forest, black bears, mule deer and white-tailed deer are the largest mammals found. Coyotes, raccoons, beavers, minks, muskrats, river otters and Columbian white-tailed deer inhabit the up-stream inlands. Throughout the forest, bald eagles, grouse, peregrine falcon and red tailed hawks are increasing in numbers. Lakes and streams are more numerous in the western section due to a higher altitude and more precipitation, and are home to the native westslope cutthroat trout. Excellent fly fishing opportunities are plentiful, especially in the Smith River.

The National Forest has 29 vehicle-accessible campgrounds. Two ski areas also operate within the forest. Almost  of hiking trails provide access to remote locations in the seven different mountain ranges within the Forest. Solitude is most common in the Crazy Mountains and in the wilderness areas near the Continental divide. Summertime average high temperatures are in the 70s °F (20s °C), but the winter can be very cold, especially in the more exposed eastern sections. Snow can linger for up to 10 months of the year along the Continental divide.

The forest lies in parts of thirteen counties. In descending order of land area, they are Lewis and Clark, Meagher, Judith Basin, Teton, Cascade, Pondera, Fergus, Wheatland, Chouteau, Glacier, Golden Valley, Sweet Grass, and Park counties.

History
In the late 19th century, after the end of the Indian Wars, the federal government worked to move Native American tribes on to Indian reservations, requiring them to cede land and extinguish their land claims to large areas of territory. The United States wanted to open the West to settlement and development by European Americans. The Blackfeet Indian Reservation, with members mostly of the Piegan Blackfeet branch, was established by Treaty of 1896 to the east of this forest area and Glacier National Park, bordering the province of Alberta, Canada to the north.

The forest was established on February 22, 1897 as the Lewis and Clarke Forest Reserve under the management of the US General Land Office. On June 9, 1903 the Flathead Forest Reserve was added, and on March 2, 1907 the spelling was changed to Lewis and Clark, and land was added. The forest territory had been transferred to the U.S. Forest Service in 1906, and was designated by the government as a National Forest.

On April 8, 1932 the entire Jefferson National Forest was added, which itself comprised the former Little Belt, Crazy Mountain, Snowy Mountains, Little Rockies and Highwood Mountains National Forests.  Finally, on July 1, 1945, part of Absaroka National Forest was added as the last portion of this forest. The Helena and Lewis and Clark National forests consolidated their administrations in 2014.

Badger-Two Medicine
The Badger-Two Medicine area is a  portion of the Lewis and Clark Forest that is adjacent to the Blackfeet Reservation and Glacier National Park. It is sacred ground for the Blackfeet tribe. The Treaty of 1896 gives Blackfeet tribal members the right to hunt and fish the area in accordance with state law and to cut wood for domestic use. The Blackfeet have battled to protect Badger-Two Medicine by keeping the area roadless and by fighting proposed oil and gas drilling all along the Front, which is managed largely by the U.S. Forest Service (USFS) and the Bureau of Land Management (BLM). The Blackfeet have been assisted by conservation groups, preservationists (including the National Trust for Historic Preservation), outdoor sportsmen, ranchers and business owners.

Approximately  are currently recognized as eligible for the National Register of Historic Places (NRHP) as a traditional cultural district (TCD), but proponents continue to lobby to have the entire Badger-Two Medicine area recognized as an eligible TCD.

In January 2011, a federal district judge cleared the roadblock on the U.S. Forest Service's Badger-Two Medicine travel plan.

Gallery

See also
 List of forests in Montana
 Alice Creek Fire

References

External links
 
 Lewis and Clark National Forest Passport in Time Oral History Project (University of Montana Archives)

 
National Forests of Montana
National Forests of the Rocky Mountains
Protected areas established in 1897
Protected areas of Cascade County, Montana
Protected areas of Teton County, Montana
Protected areas of Wheatland County, Montana
Protected areas of Meagher County, Montana
Protected areas of Judith Basin County, Montana
Protected areas of Lewis and Clark County, Montana
Protected areas of Pondera County, Montana
Protected areas of Fergus County, Montana
Protected areas of Chouteau County, Montana
Protected areas of Glacier County, Montana
Protected areas of Golden Valley County, Montana
Protected areas of Sweet Grass County, Montana
Protected areas of Park County, Montana
1897 establishments in Montana